Piter Wilkens (born August 26, 1959 in Leeuwarden, Netherlands) is a singer, guitarist, composer, lyricist, and producer who performs mainly in his native West Frisian language. His performances are often solo, but he also performs with a back up band.

His repertoire is a traditional ballad and folk styles mixed with rock and pop, typically penned himself. 

Wilkens performed with the pioneering Frisian pop band Okke Hel from 1979 until 1986, when he went solo. Besides his touring in the Netherlands, he has toured in the United States, Poland, Lithuania, Germany, Belgium, Austria, France, and Ireland. He has shared a stage with many other performers, including De Kast, Rients Gratama, Gé Reinders and the Noord Nederlands Orkest, as well as collaborating successfully with the Friese Jeugd Brass Band in 2004.

Discography
 Butter, Bread and Green Tsis, CD (1990) - Bartele Productions 001
 Sjongerbloed, 1993 - Achterdyk Produksjes - SKIIF 001
 Timmermantsjoender, 1996 - Achterdyk Produksjes - SKIIF 002
 Knoopkes, 1997 - Achterdyk Produksjes - SKIIF 003
 it Pompeblêdhert, CD-single 1998 - Pink Records - PRCS 98005
 De Bearenburch is myn Sjirurch, CD single 1999 - Achterdyk Produksjes/Marista - SKIIF 004/MCD 8480
 Nocht & Wilkens, CD 2000 - Achterdyk Produksjes/Marista - SKIIF 005/MCD 5800
 Greideroas (with the Fryske Jeugd Brassband), CD 2001 - Achterdyk Produksjes - SKIIF 006
 Romtefyts, CD 2002 - Achterdyk Produksjes - SKIIF 008
 Der tuskenút, CD 2004 - Achterdyk Produksjes - Trûb 004 (with Jaap Louwes, Gurbe Douwstra and Doede Veeman)
 Brutsen snaren, CD 2005 - Achterdyk Produksjes - SKIIF 009
 It fûgeltsje yn myn gitaar, CD 2006 - Achterdyk Produksjes - SKIIF 010
 Skodzje foar it brûken - De Rayonhaden, 1995 - Frigram - FGCD541
 Trochstrings & ko - Ferskate fryske artysten, 1998 - Maura Music - MM 039
 Simmertime 1 - De Kast, Rients Gratama, Maaike Schuurmans en Piter Wilkens Proacts - pro cd 2010
 Simmertime 2 - De Kast, Rients Gratama, Maaike Schuurmans en Piter Wilkens Proacts - pro cd 2012

External links 
 Piter Wilkens' Website

1959 births
Living people
Dutch musicians
Musicians from Friesland
People from Leeuwarden